Diego Otoya (born 13 September 2004) is a professional footballer who plays as a forward for Sporting Cristal. Born in the United States, he represents Peru at youth international level.

Club career
Born in California to a Peruvian father and American mother, Otoya played for the De Anza Force and San Jose Earthquakes at youth level. He played nine games in the MLS Next Pro for the reserve team of the San Jose Earthquakes, scoring twice, before committing to the University of California, Irvine for the end of the 2022 season. 

In January 2023, he moved to Peru to sign a professional contract with Sporting Cristal.

International career
Eligible to represent the United States and Peru at international level, Otoya has played for Peru at under-17 and under-20 level. He received his first call up to the under-20 side in July 2021.

Career statistics

Club

References

2004 births
Living people
University of California, Irvine alumni
Soccer players from San Francisco
Peruvian footballers
Peru youth international footballers
American soccer players
Peruvian people of American descent
American people of Peruvian descent
Association football forwards
MLS Next Pro players
San Jose Earthquakes players
UC Irvine Anteaters men's soccer players
Sporting Cristal footballers
De Anza Force players